Second Honeymoon is a 1930 American silent (with sound sequences) comedy-drama film, directed by Phil Rosen. It stars Josephine Dunn, Edward Earle, and Ernest Hilliard, and was released in September 1930.

Cast list
 Josephine Dunn as Mary Huntley
 Edward Earle as Jim Huntley
 Ernest Hilliard as Major Ashbrook
 Bernice Elliott as Edith
 Fern Emmett as the maid
 Harry Allen as the sheriff
 Henry Roquemore as the deputy

References

External links 
 
 
 

1930 comedy-drama films
1930s English-language films
Films directed by Phil Rosen
American black-and-white films
American silent feature films
1930 films
1930s American films
Silent American comedy-drama films